The Dukhan English School is an international school located in Dukhan, Qatar, following the British Curriculum. The school serves students from 3 to 18 years old, catering mainly to families affiliated with QatarEnergy. It was established in 1954.

References

External links 
 

British international schools in Qatar
Educational institutions established in 1954
1954 establishments in Qatar